These Admirals of the Ottoman Empire are senior naval officers ( or ) of the Ottoman Empire other than the Kapudan Pashas who were the Grand Admirals of the Ottoman fleet.

Kemal Reis (c. 1451 – 1511)
Piri Reis (1465/70–1553)
Oruç Reis (c. 1474–1518)
Turgut Reis (1485 – 23 June 1565)
Seydi Ali Reis (1498–1563)
Kurtoğlu Hızır Reis (16th century)
Aydın Reis (died 1535)
Murat Reis (c. 1534–1609)
Ebubekir Pasha (1670 – 1757/1758)
Hasan Rami Pasha (1842–1923)

See also
 Kapudan Pasha
 List of Kapudan Pashas

References

 
Admirals
Ottoman